Phillipus Jacobus Wilhelmus Schutte  (born 7 October 1969) is a South African former professional rugby union player who played as a lock.

Playing career
As a schoolboy, Schutte represented  at the annual Craven Week tournament and after school, played for the Northern Transvaal under–20 team.

Schutte toured with the Springboks to Britain and France in 1992 and in 1994 to Britain and Ireland, playing in the two test matches. His debut was against  on 19 November 1994 and he then played against  on 26 November 1994. He also played in six tour matches for the Springboks.

Test history

See also
List of South Africa national rugby union players – Springbok no. 582

References

1969 births
Living people
South African rugby union players
South Africa international rugby union players
Blue Bulls players
Golden Lions players
Western Province (rugby union) players
Border Bulldogs players
Rugby union players from Pretoria
Rugby union locks